Makendzhiev (masculine) or Makendzhieva (feminine) is a Bulgarian surname. Notable people with the surname include:

Blagoy Makendzhiev (born 1988), Bulgarian footballer
Milcho Makendzhiev (born 1989), Bulgarian footballer

Bulgarian-language surnames